Clay Figure Zhang is a famous folk art in Tianjin, China. It was created by Zhang Mingshan (1826–1906) during the Daoguang reign (1821–50) of the Qing dynasty.

Production Procedure
Clay Figure Zhang is made of ripe clay which is pure puddle with little sand through the process of weathering, slurrying, filtrating, evaporating and adding cotton to rub up. It has the characteristics of viscosity. The side materials include wood, vine, lead, paper, flowers and so on. After completely drying, the clay figure is put into the stove for firing. The temperature is up to 700 degree Celsius or so. After coming out of the stove, the clay figure is polished and painted. It takes about 30 days or so to finish a piece of work.

Artistic Attractiveness
The images of Clay Figure Zhang vary from palace maids in costume, historic figures, religious figures, and modern figures to local customs. It is usually displayed indoor, on the shelf for example, because of its small size (usually 20 cm high). Therefore, it is also called Shelf Sculpture. Clay Figure Zhang has vivid realistic characteristics, and can portray the figures' personalities and postures, pursue dissection structures, reasonable exaggerations, suitable acceptances and rejection, and special applying to give attention to both shape and spirit and have great originality.

Modern Development
The Clay Figure Zhang Workshop established in 1958, is engaged in the research of painted sculpture. It has 46 staff members, 5 creation rooms and 3 shops. Many of its artworks have been awarded and are collected by domestic and abroad art galleries. In 2006, Clay Figure Zhang was listed as first grade national legacy of China.

External links
Clay Figure Zhang Studio

Chinese pottery
Culture in Tianjin
Qing dynasty